Hockey Club Vityaz Moscow Region is a professional ice hockey team based in Podolsk, Moscow Oblast, Russia. They are members of the Bobrov Division of the Kontinental Hockey League. In the first few seasons of the KHL, the team was widely known for playing a tough and physical North American-influenced style of hockey.

History
The club was founded in 1996 in Podolsk. In 2000, the team moved to the neighboring city of Chekhov; however, the team kept playing under the name Vityaz Podolsk until 2004, where the renaming was finally done. The team initially played its home games at the Ice Palace Vityaz in Podolsk, the same arena HC MVD used until 2006. Such a thing was allowed by virtue of the opening in 2004 of a new arena in Chekhov, the Ice Hockey Center 2004, that Vityaz began using. Initially, this arena had a capacity of 1,370; it was expanded in 2007–08 to 3,300.
Vityaz played at the top level of Russian hockey for the 2000–01 season; it got relegated to Vysshaya Liga at the end of the season. In 2005, Vityaz made to the Vysshaya Liga final losing the championship to HC MVD 4 games to 1 but earned a promotion back to the elite level.

Rumors of a move back to Podolsk arose in the wake of the inaugural KHL season as even with the expansion of 2007–08, due to Chekhov's capacity being below the KHL league standards. The team restarted playing their home games in Podolsk, but remained attached to Chekhov. For the 2013–14 KHL season, the team moved back to Podolsk.

Kontinental Hockey League
Chekhov's debuts in the KHL were pretty bad. Vityaz registered a mere 6 wins in regulation, plus 5 in overtime; in counterpart for those 11 wins, the team lost 45 times (of which, 12 games were in overtime). The meager 40 points collected meant that the team finished at a dismal 23rd place out of 24, a single point ahead of the equally bad Khimik Voskresensk. Head coach Sergei Gomolyako made the mistake in October to dress one more foreign player than allowed by the rules, resulting in a match lost by forfeit. Gomolyako claimed he ignored there was such a rule, and the following week, he was fired, to be replaced by former NHL player and Vityaz head coach Mike Krushelnyski. Vityaz' fans enjoyed the return of Krushelnyski, who was had brought the team to the playoffs in 2006–07. But Chekhov's goon-full roster, which general manager Alexei Zhamnov wishes to shape after the 1990s Chicago Blackhawks for whom he played, just couldn't bring good enough performances to repeat the feat. They however led the league in penalty minutes, some 500 minutes ahead of the second most penalized club, with players such as Nathan Perrott (137 minutes in 9 matches and not a single point), Darcy Verot (more disciplined and productive than in his first season with Vityaz, even though it still only meant 5 points and 168 minutes) and Chris Simon (league leader at 263 minutes, and club's second best scorer behind Gleb Klimenko at 27 points).

Death of Alexei Cherepanov

Chekhov's season was darkened by the death of Alexei Cherepanov in October 2008, a death  occurred on its home ice and that might have been avoided had Chekhov's arena been equipped with a working defibrillator and the ambulance that is required to remain available until the end of the match not departed well before the end, resulting in much longer delays between the accident and the moment where Cherepanov arrived at the nearest hospital.

Mass brawl in Chekhov
2009–10 felt like déja-vu for Chekhov. After almost being thrown out of the league due to its finances in August (it needed to find 300 million rubles, which it did), the Knights started the season with two wins and temporarily led the league. Things didn't last however as the team finished 23rd out of 24 teams with only 13 regular-season wins (plus 3 in overtime and 2 in the shootouts—an improvement from the previous year), 54 points and, once again, a colossal amount of penalty minutes: 1522, ahead and by far every other team in the league. Vadim Berdnikov, Gleb Klimenko (who came back from Kazan) and Chris Simon led the offence with respectively 33, 27 and 25 points. 

Once again, an incident between Vityaz and Avangard marked the season. On January 9, 2010, the game between Vityaz and Avangard was stopped after 3 minutes and 39 seconds when a bench-clearing and penalty-box-clearing brawl broke out. Darcy Verot had instigated the brawl after three minutes of play when he shot the puck at an Avangard player. A mass brawl quickly followed, which the referees could deal with. However, as soon as the game was resumed, fighting resumed as well and both benches cleared to join the fight. The game was quickly getting out of hand and the officials decided it was better to cancel the whole game. Little else could be done, as a whopping total of 707 penalty minutes had been incurred – a new world record – and a total of 33 players on both teams have been ejected from the game, as well as both head coaches. Only four players avoided being ejected. The KHL imposed a total of 5.7 million rubles (about US $191,000) fines, including 150,000 rubles fines to Vityaz's Darcy Verot and Brandon Sugden and Avangard's Alexander Svitov and Dmitry Vlasenkov. Additionally, Verot, Sugden, Vlasenkov and four other Vityaz players received one-game suspensions.

Season-by-season KHL record
Note: GP = Games played, W = Wins, L = Losses, T = Ties, OTL = Overtime/shootout losses, Pts = Points, GF = Goals for, GA = Goals against

Players

Current roster

All-Star game

KHL All-Star Game
Players
 Mikhail Anisin, RW, 2011–12, 2012
 Alexander Korolyuk, RW, 2004–05, 2005–08, 2012–2014, 2013
 Chris Simon, LW, 2008–11, 2010, 2011
 Ivan Lisutin, G, 2012–15, 2014
 Maxim Afinogenov, RW, 2013–18, 2014

Head coaches

 Vyacheslav Anisin, July 1, 1997 – 31 May 1999
 Alexander Zachesov, 1 June 1999 – 11 October 2000
 Alexander Barinev, 11 October 2000 – 30 April 2001
 Valery Belov, 30 April 2001 – 15 June 2003
 Yury Rumyancev, 15 June 2003 – 5 April 2004
 Miskat Fakrutdinov, 5 April 2004 – 16 January 2005
 Alexander Bodunov, January 16, 2005 – 30 June 2005
 Anatoly Bogdanov, 30 June 2005 – 27 October 2005
 Alexander Bodunov, 27 October 2005 – 4 April 2006
 Mike Krushelnyski, 4 April 2006 – 31 March 2007
 Miskat Fakrutdinov, 18 June 2007 – 28 October 2007
 Sergey Gomolyako, 29 October 2007 – 5 November 2008
 Mike Krushelnyski, 6 November 2008 – 3 December 2009
 Alexei Yarushkin, 6 December 2009 – 14 October 2010
 Andrei Nazarov, 14 October 2010 – 18 May 2012
 Yuri Leonov, 20 June 2012 – 11 January 2014
 Oleg Orekhovskiy, 11 January 2014 – 2016
Valeri Belov, 2016 – 2019
Mikhail Kravets, 2019 – 2021
Yuri Babenko, 2021 – 2022
Vyacheslav Butsayev, 2022 – present

Franchise records and leaders

KHL scoring leaders

These are the top-ten point-scorers in franchise history in the KHL. Note: Pos = Position; GP = Games played; G = Goals; A = Assists; Pts = Points; P/G = Points per game; bold = current Vityaz player

Honors

Runners-up
 Vysshaya Liga (1): 2005

Champions
 Wingas Cup (1): 2017

 Lehner Cup (1): 2018

References

External links
  

 
Ice hockey in Moscow Oblast
Ice hockey teams in Russia
Kontinental Hockey League teams
Ice hockey clubs established in 1996
1996 establishments in Russia